Night by the Seashore is a 1981 Finnish drama film directed by Erkko Kivikoski. It was entered into the 12th Moscow International Film Festival where it won a Special Diploma.

Cast
 Pertti Palo as Mikko
 Sirkku Grahn as Liisa
 Pauli Virtanen as Heikki
 Eeva Eloranta as Pirre
 Mauri Heikkilä as Erik
 Pirkko Uitto as Jonna
 Matti Laustela as Pete

References

External links
 

1981 films
1981 drama films
1980s Finnish-language films
Films directed by Erkko Kivikoski
Finnish drama films